Kouty Mawenh (born 8 December 1971) is a Liberian sprinter. He competed in the 4 × 100 metres relay at the 1996 Summer Olympics and the 2000 Summer Olympics. He serves as Liberia's attaché to the Olympics.

References

External links
 

1971 births
Living people
Athletes (track and field) at the 1996 Summer Olympics
Athletes (track and field) at the 2000 Summer Olympics
Liberian male sprinters
Olympic athletes of Liberia
Place of birth missing (living people)